DBD may refer to:

Technology
 Database description, a type of OSPF packet
 Deep borehole disposal, a technique to dispose of nuclear waste
 Defective by Design, an anti-DRM initiative
 Dielectric barrier discharge, a type of electrical discharge
 DNA-binding domain, a protein motif
 DataBase Driver, a plug-in module for Perl DBI
 dB(D), D-weighted decibel, a decibel weighting value
 Donation after brain death, of beating heart cadaver organ donation

Other uses
 Day by Day Christian Ministries
 Death Before Dishonor (band), an American hardcore punk band
 Dead by Daylight, an asymmetric survival horror video game
 Death by Degrees, an action-adventure video game
 Democratic Farmers' Party of Germany or Demokratische Bauernpartei Deutschlands

See also